Boyarskaya is a rural locality (a village) in Beketovskoye Rural Settlement, Vozhegodsky District, Vologda Oblast, Russia. The population was 45 as of 2002.

Geography 
The distance to Vozhega is 52 km, to Beketovskaya is 0.5 km. Beketovskaya, Gashkovo, Bor are the nearest rural localities.

References 

Rural localities in Vozhegodsky District